The 25th European Women's Artistic Gymnastics Championships were held from 29 April to 2 May 2004 in Amsterdam.

Medalists

Medal table

Combined

Seniors

Juniors

Seniors

Team

The team competition also served as qualification for the individual finals. The top eight placing teams are shown below; the other teams competing were Bulgaria, Greece, Switzerland, Germany, Czech Republic, Belgium, Poland, Belarus, Slovakia, Finland, Austria, Norway, Lithuania, Hungary, Cyprus and Iceland.

Individual all-around

Vault

Uneven bars

Balance beam

Floor

Juniors

Team

Individual all-around

Vault

Uneven bars

Balance beam

Floor

References 

 
 

2004
European Artistic Gymnastics Championships
2004 in European sport
International gymnastics competitions hosted by the Netherlands
Gym